Nick Edwards (born February 24, 1984) is an Australian-born American former rugby union player. He played for the USA Eagles sevens team and made his debut in 2009.

Career
In 2013, Edwards along with 16 other players signed residency contracts with USA Rugby. He was in the New York Sevens squad that played at the 2013 World Club 7s that was held at the Twickenham Stadium. He was included in the squad for the 2013 Rugby World Cup Sevens in Moscow. He was later named in the squad for the 2013 Gold Coast and Dubai Sevens.

Edwards captained the Eagles at the 2014 USA Sevens in Las Vegas. He played at the 2014 Gold Coast Sevens at the beginning of the 2014–15 Sevens World Series but missed out on selection for the 2014 Dubai and South African Sevens before earning his way back into the squad for the 2015 Wellington Sevens.

At the 2015 Hong Kong Sevens the US sevens team drew with England to win their pool. Their loss to Samoa in the Cup quarter-finals saw them into the Plate semis, they beat Argentina but lost to Australia in the finals. Edwards and the Eagles won the Bowl finals at the Japan Sevens.

References

External links
USA Eagles Profile

1984 births
Living people
American rugby union players
Male rugby sevens players
United States international rugby sevens players
United States international rugby union players